George Huntington Browne (January 6, 1818 – September 26, 1885) was a U.S. Representative from Rhode Island.

Born in Glocester, Rhode Island, Browne attended the public schools and was graduated from Brown University in 1840.
He studied law.
He was admitted to the bar in 1843 and commenced practice in Providence, Rhode Island.

Browne was elected a representative to the so-called "Charter" General Assembly of Rhode Island in 1842.
At the same time was elected a representative to what was termed the "Suffrage" legislature and attended the latter.
He served as member of the general assembly under the constitution 1849-1852.
He was appointed United States district attorney in 1852 and served until 1861 when he resigned.
He served as delegate to the Charleston and Baltimore Democratic National Conventions in 1860.
He served as delegate to the Peace Conference of 1861, held in Washington, D.C., in an effort to devise means to prevent the impending war.

Browne was elected as a candidate of the Democratic and Constitutional Union Parties to the Thirty-seventh Congress (March 4, 1861 – March 3, 1863).
He was an unsuccessful candidate for reelection in 1862 to the Thirty-eighth Congress.
He declined the appointment as Governor of the Territory of Arizona in 1861.
He entered the Union Army as colonel of the Twelfth Regiment, Rhode Island Volunteer Infantry, October 13, 1862, and served throughout the Civil War.
He served as member of the State senate in 1872 and 1873.

Browne was elected chief justice of the supreme court of Rhode Island in May 1874 but declined the office.
He died in Providence, Rhode Island, September 26, 1885.
He was interred in Swan Point Cemetery.

Sources

1818 births
1885 deaths
Brown University alumni
Rhode Island Constitutional Unionists
Constitutional Union Party members of the United States House of Representatives
Democratic Party members of the United States House of Representatives from Rhode Island
19th-century American politicians
United States Attorneys for the District of Rhode Island